Nieuw Binckhorst is a former industrial area in southeast The Hague, Netherlands, originally called Binckhorst, for which a plan was adopted in 2009 to transform  into a mixed-use development along the lines of New Urbanism, including residential, employment and entertainment components and with Randstadrail regional light rail service. The Hague's long-term plan Structuurvisie 2020, "Structural Vision 2020", sees Nieuw Binckhorst as a future part of the city center of The Hague. It is seen as fundamental to the realization of the international ambitions of The Hague, and of the Randstad conurbation.

References

New Urbanism communities
Mixed-use developments in the Netherlands
Geography of The Hague